Phico is a small unincorporated community just south of the town of Chapmanville on Route 10 in Logan County, West Virginia, United States.

Unincorporated communities in Logan County, West Virginia
Coal towns in West Virginia
Unincorporated communities in West Virginia
Populated places on the Guyandotte River